Mama Dragons is a nonprofit 501(c)3 organization that supports, educates, and empowers mothers of LGBTQ children. Since 2013, it has grown from just a handful of moms to an organization that now supports over 9,000+ mothers. Mama Dragons' focus is on providing online support groups and educational programs where mothers can learn and connect with other Mama Dragons traveling similar paths as they learn accepting and affirming parenting practices that can help prevent LGBTQ youth suicide, depression, and homelessness. 

Mama Dragons specializes in supporting mothers that want to learn to be affirming and come from non-affirming cultures and religions. Mama Dragons programs focus on education and support for those that are new to the journey of parenting an LGBTQ child and seasoned Mama Dragons members act as mentor and guides for newer members.

History
Mama Dragons began in 2013 when Gina Crivello created a message thread to seek advice from some of the mothers she had come to know for a member of the GSA she had recently started at American Fork High School in Utah.[1] This message thread almost immediately began to grow as more mothers were added that were navigating supporting their children and the intersectionality of their non-affirming Latter-Day Saints (LDS) / Mormon religion. In January 2014 Gina moved the Facebook message thread to a Facebook group and named it the Mama Dragon Council, as conversations were becoming difficult to track.[2]

The name “Mama Dragons” came from a 2012 blog post that Meg Abhau wrote shortly after their 13-year-old son came out as gay.[3][4] Individuals of the original message thread identified with Meg's blog and contacted her, telling her that they also identified in the same manner. This blog post prompted the name of the Facebook group. Meg wrote, “I have always been a mother bear. Once I found out about Jon, that didn’t seem a fierce enough title. There is a whole new level of protection that has come over me. I now call myself a Mama Dragon. I could literally breathe fire if someone hurt my son."[5][6]

In August 2014, Gina Crivello stepped away from Facebook moving leadership over to group member Neca Allgood. In 2015, Jen Blair created Mama Dragons closed Facebook group (now renamed Mama Dragons Main Group, Private) and began running the behind the scene day to day activities. In November 2015 the LDS church (Mormon) issued the "Nov 5th Exclusion Policy", excluding married gays from the LDS religion greatly expanding the need of mom support. In 2016 Wendy Montgomery, announced a rise in LGBT suicides after the LDS church launches an LGBTQ exclusion policy on November, 5th, 2015 receiving media attention from NPR and other media outlets.[7] The group has also garnered media attention for its advocacy and efforts to prevent LGBT Mormon suicides, as well as for bringing a spotlight to the intersection of religion, family, sexual orientation, and gender expression.[8][9][10]

In 2017, Neca Allgood introduced bylaws, created a Board of Directors, and was voted in as Mama Dragons' first president alongside Julie Turnbull as President-Elect serving 1-year terms.

Led by Mama Dragons President, Julie Turnbull, President-Elect, Wendy VonSosen, and the Mama Dragons Board of Directors, Mama Dragons became a nonprofit 501(c)3 in June 2018, shortening its mission statement to, “We support, educate, and empower mothers of LGBTQ children”. The shortened mission redirected Mama Dragons' focus to providing an educational and loving space for mothers, so mothers could learn to celebrate their child and support their family's unique journey[11] and seasoned mother mentors could lend support, mentorship, and give encouraging advice. Mama Dragons opened their support group to that outside of the LDS faith in 2017 and in 2019 they shifted their focus to all moms of LGBTQ children while maintaining specialized support for mothers from non-affirming religions and cultures. In May 2019 Mama Dragons were featured in Oprah Magazine.[12]

In September 2020, Mama Dragons hired their first Executive Director, Celeste Carolin, a queer businesswoman that had previously been on the Mama Dragons Board of Directors and leadership team, replacing volunteer President roles.[13]

In 2021 Mama Dragons updated their membership policy to allow members to self-identify being a mother or being in a mothering role for admission to their support groups, making space for more diverse gender identity and expression while still focusing on the primary care giver of children in the majority of homes. As of 2022 5% of Mama Dragon members do not identify with being a cisgender woman.

Mama Dragons has grown rapidly and as of 2022 Mama Dragons is composed of roughly 30% mothers who are of the LDS faith, 20% of Christian faiths, 10% that are not religious, and the rest from many other religious denominations including Pagan, Jewish, and Buddhist.

Programs 
Parachute eLearning Program

Dr. Jennifer Howell, Mama Dragons Parachute Education Director, created an academic research-based eLearning program called Parachute in July 2021. This program is designed for parents, families, and communities and provides the knowledge, tools, and resources needed to affirm, support, and celebrate LGBTQ children.[14] The first courses focus on the Introduction to understanding your LGBTQ child and are available to all those supporting LGBTQ youth and adults. In May of 2022 Mama Dragons launched their Introduction courses in Spanish. [15]  

QPR Suicide Prevention Training

In February of 2018 Mama Dragons invested in training Mama Dragons QPR Gate Keeper instructors, a certification program for instructors to teach how to recognize suicidal behaviors and save lives by providing innovative, practical, and proven suicide prevention training.[16] As of 2022 Mama Dragons offers weekly QPR Gate Keeper training to their members.

Paper Hugs

In September 2018, Lindsay Kinman's child received cards of encouragement from another Mama Dragon member and in turn she reached out to the community to do the same. This inspired Paper Hugs, a card-sending program where Mamas send cards of encouragement to other Mama's kiddos or mamas in crisis was created after Mama Dragons member [17] In 2021 Mama Dragons sent 36,000 cards.

Wrapped In Hugs

In October of 2019 a Mama Dragon member saw a quilting article about Shannon Downey using her Instagram community to build quilts and recommended starting a blanket-making program within Mama Dragons.[18] Wrapped in Hugs was inspired by this article and is where Mamas make and send blankets to other Mama Dragons children or mothers in the support group who are in crisis.

Support Groups

Mama Dragons' primary support group is called the Mama Dragons Main Group and provides support for all mothers of LGBTQ children navigating their journey within their family and community. This group is focused on building affirming parenting and is directed toward those that are new to the journey of parenting an LGBTQ child and for more seasoned members and leaders to offer support and education.

Mama Dragons provides 7 Facebook affinity groups.

 Mamas of Transgender Children or "T-Mamas" The T-Mamas subgroup was created in response to the need for moms of transgender and non-binary children to have their own space to discuss gender and specific transition-related information.
 Mamas with Children with Special Needs.
 Madres Dragones, a Spanish-speaking Mama Dragons support group is a place to discuss the unique intersectionality of raising children who are LGBTQ and Hispanic/Latinx within the context of their primary language.
 Mamas of Color.
 Mama Dragons offers three religion-themed support subgroups to provide a space for moms who need support as they navigate the intersection of religion and raising LGBTQ children. Two of these subgroups are for moms with current or former ties to the LDS church and one subgroup is for moms from other religious denominations.
 LDS Mamas Tryna Stay - This subgroup is a safe haven for LDS moms to share their experiences and suggestions on how to navigate their relationship with the LDS church while also embracing, supporting, and raising their LGBTQ kids.
 Mamas Moving Forward from the LDS Church
 Mama's from Religious Roots - This group is a place for other Christian and religious moms to connect and discuss the intersection of faith and all things related to parenting LGBTQ children who need support as they navigate faith and their love for their children.

Regional Subgroups

Mama Dragons offers 20 Facebook regional subgroups that cover various geographical areas to provide an opportunity for Mama Dragons to connect with members in their local area, share local LGBTQ-friendly resources, and empower one another to fight against local anti-LGBTQ legislation and support pro-LGBTQ actions.

Awards

Mama Dragons was awarded Equality Utah's, Ally of the Year in October, 2016.

See also 

Gender minorities and the LDS church
Homosexuality and The Church of Jesus Christ of Latter-day Saints
LGBT Mormon people and organizations
LGBT-welcoming church programs
Timeline of LGBT Mormon history

References

LGBT family and peer support groups
LGBT Latter Day Saint organizations